The resignation of Pope Benedict XVI took effect on 28 February 2013 at 20:00 CET, following his announcement of it on 11 February. It made him the first pope to relinquish the office since Gregory XII was forced to resign in 1415 to end the Western Schism, and the first pope to voluntarily resign since Celestine V in 1294.

All other popes in the modern era have held the position from election until death. Benedict cited declining health due to old age. The conclave to select his successor began on 12 March 2013 and elected cardinal Jorge Mario Bergoglio, Archbishop of Buenos Aires, Argentina, who took the name of Francis.

Announcement
On 11 February 2013, the World Day of the Sick, a Vatican holy day, Pope Benedict XVI announced his intention to resign at the Apostolic Palace in the Sala del Concistoro, at an early morning gathering held to announce the date of the canonisation of 800 Catholic martyrs. Speaking in Latin, told the attendees that he had made "a decision of great importance for the life of the church". He cited his deteriorating strength due to old age and the physical and mental demands of the papacy. He also declared that he would continue to serve the Church "through a life dedicated to prayer".

Two days later, he presided over his final public Mass, Ash Wednesday services that ended with congregants bursting into a "deafening standing ovation that lasted for minutes" while the pontiff departed St. Peter's Basilica. On 17 February 2013, Benedict, speaking in Spanish, requested prayers for himself and the new pope from the crowd in St. Peter's Square.

Post-papacy
According to Vatican spokesman Federico Lombardi, Benedict would not have the title of cardinal upon his retirement and would not be eligible to hold any office in the Roman Curia. On 26 February 2013, Father Lombardi stated that the pope's style and title after resignation are His Holiness Benedict XVI, Roman Pontiff Emeritus, or Pope Emeritus. In later years, Benedict expressed his desire to be known simply as "Father Benedict" in conversation.

He continued to wear his distinctive white cassock without the mozzetta. Instead of the red papal shoes, he wore a pair of brown shoes that he received during a state visit to Mexico. Cardinal Camerlengo Tarcisio Bertone destroyed the Ring of the Fisherman and the lead seal of Benedict's pontificate. Benedict wore a regular ecclesiastical ring.

After his resignation, Benedict took up residence in the Papal Palace of Castel Gandolfo. As the Swiss Guard serves as the personal bodyguard to the pope, their service at Castel Gandolfo ended with Benedict's resignation. The Vatican Gendarmerie ordinarily provides security at the Papal summer residence; they became solely responsible for the former pope's personal security. Benedict moved permanently to Vatican City's Mater Ecclesiae on 2 May 2013, a monastery previously used by nuns for stays of up to several years.

Reactions

State 
Politicians around the globe reacted to the news. Australia's Prime Minister Julia Gillard, Brazil's President Dilma Rousseff, Canada's Prime Minister Stephen Harper, Germany's Chancellor Angela Merkel, United Kingdom's Prime Minister David Cameron and United States' President Barack Obama praised Benedict and his pontificate; while Italy's Prime Minister Mario Monti and Philippines' President Benigno Aquino III expressed shock and regret, respectively.

Religious

Catholic 
Cardinal Walter Brandmüller revealed that he initially thought the news of the renunciation was a "carnival joke", according to an interview he gave with the Germany daily newspaper, Bild.

Metropolitan Archbishop of Lagos Alfred Adewale Martins said of the resignation:We do not have this sort of event happening . But at the same time, we know that the Code of Canon Law promulgated in 1983 makes provision for the resignation of the pope, if he becomes incapacitated or, as with Benedict XVI, if he believes he is no longer able to effectively carry out his official functions as head of the Roman Catholic Church due to a decline in his physical ability. This is not the first time that a pope would resign. In fact, we have had not less than three who resigned, including Pope Celestine V in 1294 and Pope Gregory XII in 1415. Pope Benedict XVI was not forced into taking that decision. Like he said in his own words, he acted with "full freedom", being conscious of the deep spiritual implication of his action. ...By his decision, the Holy Father has acted gallantly and as such we must commend and respect his decision.

Cardinal Timothy M. Dolan, the archbishop of New York, said that Benedict "brought a listening heart to victims of sexual abuse".

One year before the pope's resignation, historian Jon M. Sweeney alluded to the possibility of it in his book The Pope Who Quit.

Jewish 
A spokesman for Yona Metzger, the Ashkenazi Chief Rabbi of Israel, stated: "During his period there were the best relations ever between the [Catholic] Church and the chief rabbinate, and we hope that this trend will continue. I think [Benedict] deserves a lot of credit for advancing inter-religious links the world over between Judaism, Christianity and Islam." He also said that Metzger wished Benedict XVI "good health and long days."

Buddhist 
Tenzin Gyatso, the 14th Dalai Lama and spiritual head of the Gelug sect of Tibetan Buddhism, expressed sadness over the resignation, while noting "his decision must be realistic, for the greater benefit to concern the people."

Other authors 
New York Times columnist Ross Douthat expressed that "nothing in his papacy became him like the leaving of it: His stunning 2013 resignation was the kind of revolutionary gesture that the church so badly needed." On Catholic Family News, Roberto de Mattei concluded: "The resignation of Benedict XVI [...] is for me the symbol of the surrender of the Church to the world."

It was reported at the time in La Repubblica that the pope's resignation was linked to a "gay mafia" operating within the Vatican: an underground network of high-ranking homosexual clergy, holding sex parties in Rome and the Vatican, and involved with corruption in the Vatican Bank. The pope's resignation was supposedly prompted by a 300-page dossier on the Vatican leaks scandal. In a 2016 book, The Last Conversations, the Pope Emeritus downplayed the "gay mafia" rumour, describing it as a group of four or five people who were seeking to influence Vatican decisions that he had succeeded in breaking up.

The Code of Canon Law promulgated in 1983 introduced for the first time a distinction between the Latin juridical institutes of the munus petrinum (literally "the gift of St. Peter", which means: "to be the Pope") and the ministerium petrinum (literally "the ministry of St. Peter", which means: "to do the Papal office", e.g. to sign Papal documents and to appoint bishops and cardinals). The Pope has the faculty to choose to leave the munus or the only ministerium: giving up the munus the Pope automatically refuses also the ministerium, whereas the vice versa is not possible.

According to the Italian bestseller titled Codice Ratzinger and to Stefano Violi, professor of Canon Law at the Theological Faculty of Emilia Romagna and at the Theological Faculty of Lugano, Benedict XVI gave up the only ministerium (as it is provided by the canon 332 §2) and not the munus. According to Vittorio Messori, this act was coherent with the choice of keeping the title of Pope emeritus.

Final week

Benedict XVI delivered his final Angelus on Sunday, 24 February. He told the gathered crowd, who carried flags and thanked the pope, "Thank you for your affection. [I will take up a life of prayer and meditation] to be able to continue serving the church." The pope appeared for the last time in public during his regular Wednesday audience on 27 February 2013. By 16 February, 35,000 people had already registered to attend the audience. On the evening of 27 February there was a candlelight vigil to show support for Pope Benedict XVI at St. Peter's Square. On his final day as pope, Benedict held an audience with the college of Cardinals, and at 16:15 (4:15 pm) local time he boarded a helicopter and flew to Castel Gandolfo. At about 17:30 (5:30 pm), he addressed the masses from the balcony for the last time as pope. After this speech Benedict waited out the final hours of his papacy, which ended at 20:00 CET (8:00 pm) and promptly the see of Rome became vacant.

Benevacantism 
An uncertain number of people believe that the resignation of Benedict XVI was not valid, and that he therefore never resigned and still remained pope. This position is called "Benevacantism" (a portmanteau of "Benedict” and "sedevacantism"), "resignationism", or "Beneplenism". Supporters of this position assert that the phrasing or grammar of Benedict XVI's resignation statement, given in Latin, did not effectively remove him from office of the papacy.

See also
Vatican leaks scandal
Death and funeral of Pope Benedict XVI

Notes

References

Further reading

External links

 "Declaratio, 11 February 2013 – Benedict XVI" (English translation). Vatican State: Holy See. 11 February 2013.

2013 in Italy
2013 in Vatican City
21st-century Catholicism
History of the papacy
Pope Benedict XVI
Benedict XVI
2013 in Christianity
Pope Benedict XVI
February 2013 events in Europe